Starrkärr och Näs is a locality situated in Stenungsund Municipality, Västra Götaland County, Sweden with 499 inhabitants in 2010.

References 

Populated places in Västra Götaland County
Populated places in Stenungsund Municipality